Two of the Orkney Islands in the British Isles are named Ronaldsay:

North Ronaldsay, the northernmost of the Orkney  Islands
South Ronaldsay, the southernmost of the Orkney  Islands

See also
Ronaldsway, on the Isle of Man
North Ronaldsay sheep, a breed of short-tailed sheep